Marvin Mardo Goodwin (January 16, 1891 – October 21, 1925) was a professional baseball player who was a pitcher in Major League Baseball from 1916 to 1925. He would play for the Washington Senators, St. Louis Cardinals and Cincinnati Reds. Goodwin was known for throwing the spitball, and he was one of the 17 pitchers allowed to continue throwing the pitch after it was outlawed in 1920. Goodwin was a pilot in World War I, and died after the war from injuries sustained in a training flight while a member of the Army Air Service Reserve.  He is believed to have been the first professional athlete killed as a result of a plane crash.

Early life
Goodwin was born and raised in Gordonsville, Virginia, and graduated from high school there.  He attended college for two years in New London, Connecticut, and later took a position as a telegraph operator with the Chesapeake and Ohio Railroad.  Goodwin became an established baseball star with the semipro team in his hometown, and the railroad agreed to give him time off when he was offered a contract by the Washington Senators in 1916.

Baseball career before World War I
In , Goodwin pitched for the Martinsburg Blue Sox of the Class D Blue Ridge League, starting and completing 31 games with a record of 19–12, with 10 shutouts.  His major league debut came in September of that year, when he appeared 3 times in relief for Washington, pitching  innings and giving up two earned runs.

Goodwin started the  season with the Milwaukee Brewers of the American Association, and compiled a record of 8–9 with a 1.91 ERA, before being acquired by the St. Louis Cardinals in July.  With the Cardinals his record for the season was 6–4 with a 2.21 ERA.

Military service during World War I
In December 1917, Goodwin joined the United States Army.  Being unmarried and with no dependents, he told the Cardinals he was sure to be drafted, so he enlisted in order to join the aviation corps.  He was stationed in Texas, where he successfully completed his training, and became an aviation instructor.  He was preparing to deploy to France when the war ended in November 1918.

Baseball career after World War I
After the war, Goodwin rejoined the St. Louis Cardinals.  In  his record was 11–9 with a 2.51 ERA, and in  his record was 3–8 with a 4.95 ERA.  For  and  he split time between the Cardinals and their farm club, the Houston Buffaloes of the Texas League, and then spent all of the 1923 and 1924 seasons with Houston.  In May 1924, Goodwin became player-manager of the Houston club, a role he continued through the next season.  Late in the  season he was sold to the Cincinnati Reds; he appeared in four games for the Reds, compiling a 0–2 record with a 4.79 ERA.  His final major league appearance came on the final day of the season, when he pitched a complete game in the first half of a doubleheader, but lost 4–2.

Death

Two weeks after his final appearance with the Reds, Goodwin crash landed his airplane at Ellington Field on October 18, 1925. The accident occurred during a training exercise when he was performing reserve duty with the United States Army Air Service. He was hospitalized with serious injuries including two broken legs. His piloting skills were credited with saving him from immediate death. Goodwin died on October 21, 1925, from the injuries he sustained three days earlier.

Legacy
As noted by The Sporting News, "Marvin was a gentleman and an athlete of whom baseball can be proud... Lieutenant Goodwin sacrificed his life in behalf of his country. No person can do more." Goodwin is buried in Maplewood Cemetery in his hometown of Gordonsville.

See also
List of baseball players who died during their careers

References

External links
, or Retrosheet

1891 births
1925 deaths
People from Gordonsville, Virginia
Major League Baseball pitchers
Baseball players from Virginia
Cincinnati Reds players
St. Louis Cardinals players
Washington Senators (1901–1960) players
Dallas Giants players
Houston Buffaloes managers
Houston Buffaloes players
Martinsburg Blue Sox players
Victims of aviation accidents or incidents in the United States
Accidental deaths in Texas
United States Army Air Service pilots of World War I
United States Army officers